Dietmar Jerke is an East German bobsledder who competed in the 1980s. He won two medals in the four-man event at the FIBT World Championships with a silver in 1985 and a bronze in 1983.

References
Bobsleigh four-man world championship medalists since 1930

German male bobsledders
Living people
Year of birth missing (living people)